Jeroen Van den Bogaert (born 16 March 1979 in Deurne, Belgium) is an alpine skier from Belgium.  He competed for Belgium at the 2010 Winter Olympics finishing 34th in the slalom.

References

External links
 
 
 

1979 births
Living people
Belgian male alpine skiers
Olympic alpine skiers of Belgium
Alpine skiers at the 2010 Winter Olympics
People from Deurne, Belgium
Sportspeople from Antwerp